Central High School is a public high school located in the unincorporated community of Pollok and classified as a 3A school by the UIL. It is part of the Central Independent School District serving students in northwest Angelina County, Texas. In 2015, the school was rated "Met Standard" by the Texas Education Agency.

Athletics
The Central Bulldogs compete in these sports - 

Baseball
Basketball
Cross Country
Golf
Powerlifting
Softball
Track and Field

State Titles
Baseball - 
1983(2A)
Boys Basketball - 
1956(B)
Girls Basketball - 
1959(B), 1984(2A)
Girls Softball - 
1997(3A)

References

External links
Central ISD website

Schools in Angelina County, Texas
Public high schools in Texas